Cromaclear is a trademark for CRT technology used by NEC during the mid to late-90s.  This adopted the slotted shadow mask and in-line electron gun pioneered by the 1966 GE Porta-Color and used by most then-current television tubes to computer monitor use.  It was claimed that Cromaclear could offer the image clarity and sharpness of the Trinitron and Diamondtron aperture grille CRTs without the disadvantages e.g. expense and the horizontal damping wires.

Description 

The most significant difference between Cromaclear CRTs and existing CRT computer monitor technologies is their phosphor pattern. Older color televisions and most CRT monitors have a pattern of round dots arranged in a triangular mosaic.  Slot-mask CRTs have a pattern of stripes in the unlit phosphor that appears to be bricks when in use.  The slots block less of the electron beam than dots, resulting in a brighter picture. 

With Cromaclear CRTs, the conventional "dot pitch" measurement is no longer as accurate. The term "mask pitch" is more appropriate when discussing this specification.  A mask pitch measurement is the distance between like-colored phosphors on a Cromaclear mask. The mask pitch of a Cromaclear screen is 0.25 mm.

Image quality 
Overall monitor image quality is difficult to quantify. Given the inherent complex nature of CRTs, a variety of factors combine to produce a monitor’s image. These factors — focus, contrast and color saturation — all come into play when deciding which monitor and technology provides the "best" image. When discussed in relation to Cromaclear, these items need further explanation.

Focus: Cromaclear incorporates a new SDF-ELA (Single Dynamic Focus - Expanded Large Aperture) gun for 15-inch tubes and DQF- ELA (Dynamic Quadrupole Focus - Expanded Large Aperture) gun for 17-inch tubes. These guns provide uniform image clarity and focus. When viewing images in monitor's corners, other CRTs could distort image ratio and perspective. Using the Cromaclear-specific ELA gun, this problem is virtually eliminated. This also provides improvements for viewing six-point text and fine, single-pixel elements.

As a consequence of Cromaclear's new mask form, the electron beam used to pass through the slot mask had to be adapted to match. The ELA gun utilized for Cromaclear has an exact beam/mask match (an elliptical electron beam passes through an elliptical mask opening) for optimum power transfer from electron beam to screen phosphors.

Although it was possible to use existing round phosphor gun technology with Cromaclear, a certain percentage of electron power would have been lost, thereby degrading overall image focus. An effective visual to describe this phenomenon is a "round peg, square hole" analogy: while contact might be taking place, it’s not completely precise. Excess energy transfer could lead to a warped grille or mask, resulting in possible image degradation (color purity and/or brightness uniformity problems). This mismatch tends to occur in aperture grille CRTs (stripe grille/circular electron beam). On the other hand, shadow mask CRTs match a circular beam to a circular shadow mask.

This combination of dynamic beam focus and new electron guns also reduces the need for end-user moiré and convergence controls while enhanced brightness provides improved contrast.

Convergence 
Convergence is the process of controlling the CRT beam deflection to keep the red, green and blue beams properly overlapped when scanning the raster (area illuminated by the scan lines on a CRT). As the electron gun scans across the screen, the shape of electron beams slightly varies as the beam reaches the outer edges of the screen. Misconvergence, the technical term used when this process is not completely accurate, appears as color fringing on the edge of an image displayed on the screen. For example, a CRT monitor with misaligned electron beams will show a white "H" on a black background with one of the primary or secondary colors shadowing its edges. Cromaclear provides deterrents to misconvergence, including the ELA guns and their tight mask pitch.

Cromaclear vs. aperture grille CRTs 

Aperture grille CRT monitors currently use damping wires to hold the black striping in place between the phosphors. Comparatively, Cromaclear utilizes a type of shadow mask that does not require the use of damping wires. Damping wires can sometimes be visible to the user under extreme white plain background displays and mechanically obstruct the flow of the electron beams, critical to maximizing image focus. The Cromaclear shadowmask, however, still has much more impeding metal than an aperture grill mask, leading overall to a darker, softer picture than the equivalent aperture grill CRT.  The impact of damping wires of the aperture grill CRT, is far less than the total extra metal in the cromaclear mask which is effectively like having a thick damping wire for each row of phosphor.  This in turn means that the cromaclear CRT needs a much more powerful electron beam to illuminate the phosphors brightly, which reduces the overall life of the CRT and its focusing ability, which is the most expensive part of any CRT monitor or television.

Damping wires are sensitive and are more susceptible to shipping damage, but usually the glass would be broken before the damping wires give way, making aperture grill CRTs equally robust to any other under normal conditions. They also have the potential to be affected by harmonic distortion when speakers are placed near the CRT, however for this to be a visible problem the speakers would need to be impractically close to the screen and producing a very high sound output, so in effect this effect would have to be contrived by speaker position rather than a problem in operation.

Additionally since aperture grill CRTs have no "horizontal" elements to the shadow mask, the resolution of the CRT in the vertical direction is limited by the focus of the electron beam and the granularity of the phosphor, unlike Cromaclear and other shadow mask based CRTs whose vertical resolution is limited by the number of rows of metal in the mask.

Cromaclear vs. "conventional" shadow mask CRTs 

Cromaclear CRTs improve upon the image sharpness and focus attributed to shadow mask based dot trio CRTs. The slot mask design and illuminated phosphor alignment provide a tighter mask pitch, leading to improved image quality. In addition, the tighter mask pitch and ELA guns enhance focus and combat moiré.

See also
 Shadow mask
 Aperture grille

External links
NEC Display Site
Cromaclear white paper

Cathode ray tube